Vincent du Vigneaud (May 18, 1901 – December 11, 1978) was an American biochemist. He was recipient of the 1955 Nobel Prize in Chemistry "for his work on biochemically important sulphur compounds, especially for the first synthesis of a polypeptide hormone," a reference to his work on the peptide hormone oxytocin.

Biography
Vincent du Vigneaud was born in Chicago in 1901, the son of French inventor and mechanic Alfred du Vigneaud and Mary Theresa. He studied at the Schurz High School and completed secondary education in 1918. His interest in sulfur began when he entered high school and his new friends invited him to run chemical experiments on explosives using sulfur. During World War I, senior students were made to work on farms, and Vigneuad worked near Caledonia, Illinois. There he became an expert in milking cows, which inspired him to become a farmer. However, his elder sister, Beatrice, persuaded him to take up chemistry at the University of Illinois at Urbana-Champaign, after which he enrolled in the chemical engineering course. He later recalled: I found during the first year that it was chemistry rather than engineering that appealed to me most. I switched to a major in chemistry since I was deeply impressed by the senior student's work, especially in organic chemistry. I also found that I was most interested in those aspects of organic chemistry that had to do with medical substances and began to develop an interest in biochemistry.His interest was aroused by lectures of Carl Shipp Marvel and Howard B. Lewis, whom he remembered as "extremely enthusiastic about sulfur." With little support from the family, he found odd jobs to support himself. After receiving his MS in 1924 he joined DuPont.

He married Zella Zon Ford, whom he met on June 12, 1924 while working as a waiter during his university course. During the fall of 1924, Marvel found him a job as an assistant biochemist at the Philadelphia General Hospital that helped him to teach clinical chemistry at the Graduate School of Medicine, University of Pennsylvania. Marvel would pay for the trip to Pennsylvania in exchange for Vigneaud's preparation of 10 pounds of cupferron. Resuming his academic career in 1925, du Vigneaud joined the group of John R. Murlin at the University of Rochester for his PhD thesis. He graduated in 1927 with his work The Sulfur of Insulin.

After a post-doctoral position with John Jacob Abel at Johns Hopkins University Medical School (1927–1928), he traveled to Europe as National Research Council Fellow in 1928–1929, where he worked with Max Bergmann and Leonidas Zervas at the Kaiser Wilhelm Institute for Leather Research in Dresden, and with George Barger at the University of Edinburgh Medical School. He then returned to the University of Illinois as a professor.

In 1932 he started working at the George Washington University Medical School in Washington, D.C.  and in 1938 at the Cornell Medical College in New York City, where he stayed until his emeritation in 1967. Following retirement, he held a position at Cornell University in Ithaca, New York.

In 1974 du Vigneaud suffered a stroke which forced his retirement. He died in 1978, one year after his wife's death in 1977.

Scientific contributions
Vigneaud's career was characterized by an interest in sulfur-containing peptides, proteins, and especially peptide hormones. Even before his Nobel-Prize-winning work on elucidating and synthesizing oxytocin and vasopressin via manipulating the AVP gene, he had established a reputation from his research on insulin, biotin, transmethylation, and penicillin.

He also carried out a series of structure-activity relationships for oxytocin and vasopressin, perhaps the first of their type for peptides. That work culminated in the publication of a book entitled A Trail of Research in Sulphur Chemistry and Metabolism and Related Field.

Honours 
Vigneaud joined Alpha Chi Sigma while at the University of Illinois in 1930. He received the 1955 Nobel Prize in Chemistry "for his work on biochemically important sulphur compounds, especially for the first synthesis of a polypeptide hormone," a reference to his work on the peptide hormone oxytocin.

See also
 University of Rochester
 List of Nobel Laureates affiliated with the University of Rochester

References

External links
  including the Nobel Lecture, December 12, 1955 A Trail of Sulfa Research: From Insulin to Oxytocin
 http://weill.cornell.edu/archives/pdf/personal_aids/DuVigneaud.pdf

1901 births
1978 deaths
American biochemists
American Nobel laureates
Cornell University faculty
Nobel laureates in Chemistry
Recipients of the Albert Lasker Award for Basic Medical Research
University of Illinois Urbana-Champaign alumni
Academics of the University of Edinburgh
George Washington University faculty
Scientists from Chicago
Members of the United States National Academy of Sciences
Fellows of the American Academy of Arts and Sciences
Carl Schurz High School alumni